Arturo Buzzi-Peccia (13 October 1854 – 29 August 1943) was an Italian singing instructor and song composer.

Biography
Buzzi-Peccia was born 13 October 1854 in Milan, Italy, to Antonio and Clotilde Peccia. In 1868, he was accepted at the Milan Conservatory where he studied composition under Antonio Bazzini.  In the late 1870s, he went to Paris to continue his studies under Massenet and Saint-Saëns. He returned to Italy, first to Milan and eventually taking a position in Turin as a voice teacher.

He began to write music while still in school, and composed three works to secure his diploma from the Milan Conservatory in 1875. In 1886 his  was performed at La Scala.  His symphonic poem  received critical acclaim when it premiered at La Scala in 1888.  The 1897 premiere in Turin of Buzzi-Peccia's only opera, was conducted by Arturo Toscanini.  One of his best-known works is "Lolita: Serenata spagnola" (1892), recorded by many singers over the years including Enrico Caruso, Titta Ruffo, Mario Lanza and Franco Corelli. His  was sung by Joseph Schmidt in the 1934 film My Song Goes Round the World. Most of his songs were written in Italian, but he also wrote lyrics in French and English.  His most famous novelty song,  (Song of the Cigarette), was written in French.

He came to the United States in 1898 to teach voice at the Chicago Musical College with references from such notables as Giuseppe Verdi and Arrigo Boito.  Two years later Buzzi-Peccia moved to New York to teach at the Metropolitan College of Music. He was the first voice teacher of Alma Gluck, and also of Sophie Braslau.  Another pupil of Buzzi-Peccia was the poet Dorothy Caruso, wife of Enrico Caruso.

In addition to Caruso, many artists recorded Buzzi-Peccia's songs, among them Beniamino Gigli, Carlo Bergonzi, Luciano Pavarotti, Giuseppe Di Stefano, and Roberto Alagna.

Selected music

Songs
 "Ave Maria".
 .
 "Black Magic", words by C. D. Isaacson.
 , barcarolle for pianoforte.
  for pianoforte.
  (Song of the Cigarette), words in English by R. Lorfin.
  (Columbine: a Venetian serenade).
 "Come buy", from Shakespeare's The Winter's Tale.
 "The Conscientious Deacon", words by V. Lindsay.
 "Eternal Light!" (Lux eterna)
 "Fair Dreams"; words by Axel, English version by P. C. Warren.
 "A Fly Song", tragicomical encore ditty, etc., words by J. D. Wells.
 Four French Songs. (1915)
 Four Songs on texts by Rabindranath Tagore, 1920, published by Oliver Ditson
Forget the Night
In the Flower Garden
The Song of Ahez the Pale
When I go alone
 "Gloria". Duet for soprano and alto, words by M. C. Schuyler.
 "Going to War".
 "Good Night my Love".

 . (1892)
 "Mariolina: a love call" (c. 1934).*  (Glory to Love). (1904)
 .
 .
 Two Encore Songs
"My mother bids me spend my smiles", words by T. Hood.
"Venus' runaway", words by B. Jonson.

Piano music
 , .

Notes

References

External links
Arturo Buzzi-Peccia in Discography of American Historical Recordings at UC Santa Barbara

1854 births
1943 deaths
19th-century classical composers
19th-century Italian male musicians
20th-century classical composers
20th-century Italian composers
20th-century Italian male musicians
Italian Romantic composers
Italian classical composers
Italian male classical composers
Italian emigrants to the United States
Musicians from Milan
Voice teachers